The men's 3 metre springboard diving competition at the 2015 Summer Universiade in Gwangju was held on 3–4 July at the Nambu University International Aquatics Center.

Schedule
All times are Korea Standard Time (UTC+09:00)

Results

References

External links
Official website

Diving at the 2015 Summer Universiade